The 2012 United States House of Representatives elections were held on November 6, 2012. It coincided with the reelection of President Barack Obama.  Elections were held for all 435 seats representing the 50 U.S. states and also for the delegates from the District of Columbia and five major U.S. territories. The winners of this election cycle served in the 113th United States Congress. This was the first congressional election using districts drawn up based on the 2010 United States census.

Although Democratic candidates received a nationwide plurality of more than 1.4 million votes (1.2%) in all House elections, the Republican Party won a 33-seat advantage in the state-apportioned totals, thus retaining its House majority by 17 seats. Democrats had picked up 27 seats, enough to win back control of the House, but most of these gains were canceled out due to Republican gains as well as reapportionment, leaving the Democrats with a net gain of eight seats.

This disparity – common in close elections involving single-member district voting – has generally been attributed to targeted, widespread Republican gerrymandering in the congressional redistricting process following the 2010 United States Census. Some analysts believe that in addition to Republican gerrymandering, another factor that helped the GOP maintain control of Congress (despite receiving fewer votes) was "unintentional gerrymandering," as the high concentration of Democrats in urban centers led to "wasted votes" in districts that easily elected Democratic candidates. The GOP also had a greater number of incumbents, and incumbents tend to have an advantage in elections.

In the 20th century, the party with a plurality of the popular vote was unable to receive a majority in the House on four occasions- 1952 and 1996, in which the Republicans held a majority in the House. Meanwhile, the 1914 and 1942 elections were the last time that the Democrats won a majority in the House without winning the popular vote.

As of 2022, this is the last congressional election in which the Democrats won a House seat in West Virginia.

Results summary

Federal 

!  style="background:#e9e9e9; text-align:center;" rowspan="2" colspan="2"| Parties
!  style="background:#e9e9e9; text-align:center;" colspan="4"| Seats
!  style="background:#e9e9e9; text-align:center;" colspan="3"| Popular vote
|- style="background:#e9e9e9;"
| style="text-align:center;"| 2010
| style="text-align:center;"|2012
| style="text-align:center;"|Netchange
| style="text-align:center;"|Strength
| style="text-align:center;"|Vote
| style="text-align:center;"|%
| style="text-align:center;"|Change
|-
| style="background-color:;" | 
|align="left"| Republican Party
|align="right"| 242
|align="right"| 234
|align="right"|  8
|align="right"| 53.8%
|align="right"| 58,283,314
|align="right"| 47.7%
|align="right"| −4.0%
|-
| style="background-color:;"| 
|align="left"| Democratic Party
|align="right"| 193
|align="right"| 201
|align="right"|  8
|align="right"| 46.2%
|align="right"| 59,645,531
|align="right"| 48.8%
|align="right"| +3.9%
|-
| style="background-color:;" | 
|align="left"| Libertarian Party
|align="right"| –
|align="right"| –
|align="right"| –
|align="right"| –
|align="right"| 1,360,925
|align="right"| 1.1%
|align="right"| −0.1%
|-
| style="background-color:;" | 
|align="left"| Independent
|align="right"| –
|align="right"| –
|align="right"| –
|align="right"| –
|align="right"| 1,240,672
|align="right"| 1.0%
|align="right"| +0.4%
|-
| style="background-color:;" | 
|align=left|Green Party
|align="right"| –
|align="right"| –
|align="right"| –
|align="right"| –
|align="right"| 373,455
|align="right"| 0.3%
|align="right"| –
|-
| style="background-color:;" | 
|align=left|Constitution Party
|align="right"| –
|align="right"| –
|align="right"| –
|align="right"| –
|align="right"| 111,576
|align="right"| 0.1%
|align="right"| −0.1%
|-
| style="background-color:;" | 
|align=left|Reform Party
|align="right"| –
|align="right"| –
|align="right"| –
|align="right"| –
|align="right"| 70,682
|align="right"| 0.1%
|align="right"| +0.1%
|-
| style="background-color:;" | 
|align=left|Others
|align="right"| -
|align="right"| -
|align="right"| -
|align="right"| -
|align="right"| 1,205,344
|align="right"| 1.0%
|align="right"| +0.1%
|-  style="background:#ccc; text-align:center;"
| colspan="2"| Totals
|| 435
|| 435
|| 0
|| 100.0%
|| 122,291,499
|| 100.0%
|| -
|- style="background:#e9e9e9;"
| style="text-align:left;" colspan="9"|Source: Election Statistics – Office of the Clerk (does not include blank or over/under votes)
|}

Per state

Maps

Retiring incumbents 
Forty-one Representatives retired. Thirty-four of those seats were held by the same party, six seats changed party.

Democrats 
Twenty-two Democrats retired. Fourteen of those seats were held by Democrats, five were won by Republicans, and three seats were eliminated in redistricting.

Democratic held 
 : Lynn Woolsey, was succeeded by Jared Huffman (with district being renumbered as California 2).
 California 51: Bob Filner, to run for Mayor of San Diego, was succeeded by Juan Vargas.
 Connecticut 5: Chris Murphy, to run for U.S. Senate, was succeeded by Elizabeth Esty.
 Hawaii 2: Mazie Hirono, to run for U.S. Senate, was succeeded by Tulsi Gabbard.
 : Jerry Costello, was succeeded by William Enyart.
 Massachusetts 4: Barney Frank, was succeeded by Joseph P. Kennedy III.
 Michigan 5: Dale Kildee, was succeeded by Dan Kildee.
 Nevada 1: Shelley Berkley, to run for U.S. Senate, was succeeded by Dina Titus.
 New Mexico 1: Martin Heinrich, to run for U.S. Senate, was succeeded by Michelle Lujan Grisham.
 New York 5: Gary Ackerman, was succeeded by Grace Meng (with district being renumbered as New York 6).
 New York 10: Edolphus Towns, was succeeded by Hakeem Jeffries (with district being renumbered as New York 8).
 Texas 20: Charlie Gonzalez, was succeeded by Joaquín Castro.
 Washington 6: Norm Dicks, was succeeded by Derek Kilmer.
 Wisconsin 2: Tammy Baldwin, to run for U.S. Senate, was succeeded by Mark Pocan.

Republican gain 
: Mike Ross, was succeeded by Tom Cotton.
: Joe Donnelly, to run for U.S. Senate, was succeeded by Jackie Walorski.
: Heath Shuler, was succeeded by Mark Meadows.
: Brad Miller, was succeeded by George Holding.
: Dan Boren, was succeeded by Markwayne Mullin.

Seats eliminated in redistricting
: Dennis Cardoza.
 Massachusetts 1: John Olver.
 : Maurice Hinchey.

Republicans 
Nineteen Republicans retired. Fifteen of those seats were held by Republicans, one was won by a Democrat, and three seats were eliminated in redistricting.

Republican held 
 : Jeff Flake, to run for U.S. Senate, was succeeded by Matt Salmon (with district being renumbered as Arizona 5).
 : Wally Herger, was succeeded by Doug LaMalfa (with district being renumbered as California 1).
 : Jerry Lewis, was succeeded by Paul Cook (with district being renumbered as California 8).
 Florida 14: Connie Mack IV, to run for U.S. Senate, was succeeded by Trey Radel (with district being renumbered as Florida 19).
 Illinois 15: Tim Johnson, was succeeded by Rodney L. Davis (with district being renumbered as Illinois 13).
 Indiana 5: Dan Burton, was succeeded by Susan Brooks.
 Indiana 6: Mike Pence, to run for Governor of Indiana, was succeeded by Luke Messer.
 Missouri 2: Todd Akin, to run for U.S. Senate, was succeeded by Ann Wagner.
 Michigan 11: Thaddeus McCotter: failed to make the ballot for renomination due to fraudulent signatures, was succeeded by Kerry Bentivolio.
 Montana at-large: Denny Rehberg, to run for U.S. Senate, was succeeded by Steve Daines.
 North Carolina 9: Sue Myrick, was succeeded by Robert Pittenger.
 North Dakota at-large: Rick Berg, to run for U.S. Senate, was succeeded by Kevin Cramer.
 Ohio 14: Steve LaTourette, was succeeded by David Joyce.
 Pennsylvania 19: Todd Russell Platts, was succeeded by Scott Perry (with district being renumbered as Pennsylvania 4).
 Texas 14: Ron Paul, to run for U.S. President, was succeeded by Randy Weber.

Democratic gain 
 California 24: Elton Gallegly, was succeeded by Julia Brownley (with district being renumbered as California 26).

Seats eliminated in redistricting
: David Dreier.
 New York 9: Bob Turner, who ran for U.S. Senate.
 Ohio 7: Steve Austria.

Incumbents defeated 
As a result of redistricting, many incumbents were forced to compete against each other in the same district, which resulted in a larger number of incumbents being defeated in primaries.

In primary elections 
Thirteen representatives lost renomination: Eight were lost in redistricting battles pitting incumbents against each other, and five incumbents lost nomination to non-incumbent challengers.

Democrats 
Seven Democrats lost renomination: five in redistricting and two to a non-incumbent challenger.

Seat held by a Democrat 
These primary winners later won the general election.

 : Hansen Clarke lost a redistricting race to fellow incumbent Gary Peters
 : Russ Carnahan lost a redistricting race to fellow incumbent Lacy Clay
 : Steve Rothman lost a redistricting race to fellow incumbent Bill Pascrell
 : Dennis Kucinich lost a redistricting race to fellow incumbent Marcy Kaptur
 : Tim Holden lost to challenger Matt Cartwright
 : Silvestre Reyes lost to challenger Beto O'Rourke

Seat lost to a Republican 
 : Jason Altmire lost a redistricting race to fellow incumbent Mark Critz, who later lost the general election

Republicans 
Six Republicans lost renomination: three in redistricting races and three to a non-incumbent challenger. All the seats were held by Republicans.
 : Ben Quayle lost a redistricting race to fellow incumbent David Schweikert
 : Cliff Stearns lost to challenger Ted Yoho
 : Sandy Adams lost a redistricting race to fellow incumbent John Mica
 : Don Manzullo lost a redistricting race to fellow incumbent Adam Kinzinger
 : Jean Schmidt lost to challenger Brad Wenstrup
 : John A. Sullivan lost to challenger Jim Bridenstine

In the general election

Democrats 
Ten incumbent Democrats lost re-election; four to fellow Democrats and six to Republicans. Four losses were in California: two due to redistricting putting two incumbents together (resulting in a net loss of two for the Democrats) and two due to the state's top two primary. Two incumbents outside of California lost to Republican incumbents after being redistricted to the same district.

Seat held by a Democrat 
: Pete Stark lost to Eric Swalwell
: Howard Berman lost a redistricting race to fellow incumbent Brad Sherman
: Joe Baca lost to Gloria Negrete McLeod
: Laura Richardson lost a redistricting race to fellow incumbent Janice Hahn

Seat lost to a Republican incumbent 
: Leonard Boswell lost a redistricting race to Tom Latham
: Betty Sutton lost a redistricting race to Jim Renacci

Seat lost to a Republican challenger 
: Ben Chandler lost to Andy Barr.
: Kathy Hochul lost to Chris Collins.
: Larry Kissell lost to Richard Hudson.
: Mark Critz lost to Keith Rothfus.

Republicans 
Seventeen incumbent Republicans lost re-election.

Seat held by a Republican 
One incumbent Republican lost re-election to a fellow incumbent Republican.
: Jeff Landry lost to Charles Boustany

Seat lost to a Democratic challenger 
Sixteen incumbent Republicans, ten of whom were first elected in 2010, lost re-election to Democrats.

: Dan Lungren lost to Ami Bera.
: Mary Bono Mack lost to Raul Ruiz.
: Brian Bilbray lost to Scott Peters.
: Allen West lost to Patrick Murphy.
: David Rivera lost to Joe Garcia.
: Joe Walsh lost to Tammy Duckworth.
: Robert Dold lost to Brad Schneider.
: Judy Biggert lost to Bill Foster
: Bobby Schilling lost to Cheri Bustos.
: Roscoe Bartlett lost to John K. Delaney.
: Chip Cravaack lost to Rick Nolan
: Frank Guinta lost to Carol Shea-Porter
: Charles Bass lost to Ann Kuster.
: Nan Hayworth lost to Sean Patrick Maloney.
: Ann Marie Buerkle lost to Dan Maffei
: Quico Canseco lost to Pete Gallego.

Newly created seats 
Of the 435 districts created in the 2010 redistricting, nineteen had no incumbent representative.

Democratic gain 
Twelve Democrats were elected in newly created seats.

: won by Ann Kirkpatrick
: won by Kyrsten Sinema
: won by Tony Cardenas
: won by Mark Takano
: won by Alan Lowenthal
: won by Alan Grayson
: won by Lois Frankel
: won by Joyce Beatty
: won by Marc Veasey
: won by Filemon Vela Jr.
: won by Steven Horsford
: won by Denny Heck

Republican gain 
Seven Republicans were elected in newly created seats.

: won by David Valadao
: won by Ron DeSantis
: won by Doug Collins
: won by Tom Rice
: won by Roger Williams
: won by Steve Stockman
: won by Chris Stewart

Closest races 
In sixty-four races the margin of victory was less than 10%.

Election ratings

Special elections 

There were six special elections in 2012. Winners would have a seniority advantage over other freshmen.  Two elections were held separate from the November elections and four elections were held concurrent with the November elections.

Alabama

Alaska

Arizona 

Arizona gained one seat in reapportionment. A second open seat was created when a pair of Republicans were redistricted into the same district. Primary elections were August 28, 2012.

Arkansas

California 

California retained its fifty-three seats: four new seats were created when four pairs of Representatives were redistricted to run against each other. An additional Republican incumbent, Gary Miller, won re-election in an entirely different district from the one he had previously represented. The election featured the first use of the top-two primary system in which primary elections list candidates from all parties on one ballot, and the top two vote-getters advance to the general election. Two elections (30th and 44th districts) featured two Democratic incumbents running against each other.

Colorado

Connecticut 

Primary elections were held August 14, 2012.

Delaware

Florida 

Florida gained two seats in reapportionment. As a result of the Fair Districts Amendment, approved by voters via referendum in 2010, the legislature could not take incumbency into account in drawing the lines. As a result, two incumbent Republicans, John Mica and Sandy Adams, were drawn into the same district, creating a third new seat.

Georgia 

Georgia gained one seat in reapportionment.

Hawaii

Idaho

Illinois 

Illinois lost one seat in reapportionment, forcing a pair of incumbent Republicans into the same district.

Indiana

Iowa 

Iowa lost one seat in reapportionment, forcing a pair of incumbents, a Democrat and a Republican, into the same district.

Kansas 

Primary elections were held August 7, 2012.

Kentucky

Louisiana 

Louisiana lost one seat in reapportionment, forcing a pair of incumbent Republicans into the same district.

Maine

Maryland

Massachusetts 

Massachusetts lost one seat in reapportionment, forcing a pair of incumbent Democrats into the same district, although one, John Olver, retired in advance of the legislature's approval of new maps. Primary elections were held September 6, 2012.

Michigan 

Michigan lost one seat in reapportionment, forcing a pair of Democrats into the same district. Primary elections were held August 7, 2012.

Minnesota

Mississippi

Missouri 

Missouri lost one seat in reapportionment; two Democrats were drawn into the same district as a result. Primary elections were held August 7, 2012.

Montana

Nebraska

Nevada 

Nevada gained one seat in reapportionment.

New Hampshire

New Jersey 

New Jersey lost one seat in reapportionment, forcing two incumbent Democrats into the same district.

New Mexico

New York 

New York lost two seats in reapportionment. After the legislature failed to reach agreement, New York conducted its 2012 congressional elections under a map drawn by a federal magistrate judge. Two incumbent Representatives saw their districts eliminated; one, Maurice Hinchey, chose to retire, while the other, Bob Turner, chose to run for the U.S. Senate. A third incumbent impacted by redistricting, Gary Ackerman, chose to retire, creating an open seat.

North Carolina

North Dakota

Ohio 

Ohio lost two seats in reapportionment. Three pairs of incumbents were redistricted together, and one new seat was created.

Oklahoma

Oregon

Pennsylvania 

Pennsylvania lost one seat in reapportionment, forcing two incumbent Democrats to run against each other, with the seat ultimately being won by a Republican challenger in November.

Rhode Island 

The primary election was held September 11, 2012.

South Carolina 

South Carolina gained one seat in reapportionment.

South Dakota

Tennessee

Texas 

Texas gained four seats in reapportionment. After the initial redistricting map drawn by the Texas Legislature was denied pre-clearance by a federal district court under Section 5 of the Voting Rights Act, Texas conducted its 2012 congressional elections under a court-ordered interim map.

Utah 

Utah gained one seat in reapportionment.

Vermont

Virginia

Washington 

Washington gained one seat in reapportionment. Primary elections were held August 7, 2012.

West Virginia

Wisconsin

Wyoming

Non-voting delegates 

Puerto Rico's Resident Commissioner is elected to a four-year term during U.S. presidential election years. It is the only seat in the House elected for a four-year term.

See also 
 2012 United States elections
 2012 United States gubernatorial elections
 2012 United States presidential election
 2012 United States Senate elections
 112th United States Congress
 113th United States Congress

Footnotes

References

Further reading 
 Foreman, Sean D.,  and Robert Dewhirst, eds.  Roads to Congress, 2012  (Lexington Books; 2013) 326 pages; covers the  2012 Congressional races, as well as campaign finance, redistricting, and "voter suppression" laws.

External links 
Candidates for U.S. Congress at Project Vote Smart
U.S. House of Representatives from OurCampaigns.com
Congressional Races in 2012 from Open Secrets (campaign contributions)

U.S. House of Representatives Elections in 2012 from Ballotpedia
The Cook Political Report PVI Scores
Race ratings
Ratings from The Cook Political Report
Ratings at The New York Times
Ratings from Real Clear Politics
Ratings from Roll Call
Ratings at Sabato